Arthur Sewell (born 15 July 1934) is an English former professional footballer who played as an inside left.

Career
Born in West Cornforth, Sewell moved from Bishop Auckland to Bradford City in April 1954. He made 1 league appearance for the club, before being released in 1955.

Sources

References

1934 births
Living people
English footballers
Bishop Auckland F.C. players
Bradford City A.F.C. players
English Football League players
Association football inside forwards